Causey is a surname. Notable people with the surname include:

Brian Causey, American guitarist and composer
Jeff Causey (born 1971), American soccer goalkeeper
John W. Causey (1841–1908), American farmer and politician
Matthew Causey, American actor known for his role in the movie The Party Animal
Peter F. Causey (1801–1871), American merchant and politician from Milford, Delaware
Richard Causey (born 1960), Enron's Executive Vice President and Chief Accounting Officer during the Enron accounting scandal
Wayne Causey (born 1936), American baseball infielder